Pauline Knowles (16 December 1967 – 17 October 2018) was an award-winning Scottish actress and singer who appeared on stage and television.

Early life 

Pauline Knowles was born in Edinburgh, Scotland, the 12th of 13 children.  She attended Holy Rood HIgh School, and after one year at Stirling University, she transferred to the Royal Conservatoire of Scotland (formerly known as the Royal Scottish Academy of Music and Drama.)

Career 
Knowles appeared in major theatres across Scotland, including the Lyceum Theatre in Edinburgh, the Wildcat, the Traverse theatre, Theatre Babel and the Citizens Theatre.  Television appearances included roles in Strathblair and Taggart

She also appeared in musicals such as Man of La Mancha, and a chamber opera, The Garden, by John and Zinnie Harris.

In 2019, the Royal Conservatoire of Scotland established the Pauline Knowles Scholarship Fund in her honour, to support Scottish or Scottish-based BA acting students at the start of their careers.

Awards 
In 2016, Knowles won a Critics' Award for Theatre in Scotland, as Best Female Performance in the role of Clytemnestra, in This Restless House, a play by Zinnie Harris based on the Oresteia. She gained the Best Performer award at the Adelaide festival in Australia after appearing in "Fleeto and Wee Andy".

References 

Scottish actresses
1967 births
2018 deaths
Actresses from Edinburgh